United States v. Matlock, 415 U.S. 164 (1974), was a Supreme Court of the United States case in which the Court ruled that the Fourth Amendment prohibition on unreasonable searches and seizures was not violated when the police obtained voluntary consent from a third party who possessed common authority over the premises sought to be searched. The ruling of the court established the "co-occupant consent rule," which was later explained by Illinois v. Rodriguez, 497 U.S. 177 (1990) and distinguished later by Georgia v. Randolph (2006), in which the court held that a third party could not consent over the objections of a present co-occupant, and Fernandez v. California (2014), where the court held when the objecting co-resident is removed for objectively reasonable purposes (such as lawful arrest), the remaining resident may validly consent to search.

See also
 List of United States Supreme Court cases, volume 415

References

External links
 

United States Fourth Amendment case law
United States Supreme Court cases
United States Supreme Court cases of the Burger Court
1974 in United States case law